The term formular (often misspelled formula) is an adjective applied to envelopes, cards and aerograms, etc., produced by postal authorities or to their specification, but bearing no imprinted or embossed stamp or other indication of prepayment of postage.

Formular stationery require the addition of an adhesive stamp before posting. Formular items do not technically meet the definition of "postal stationery" (since there is no prepayment of postage), but the strong likeness to it secures them a place in many postal stationery collections.

Countries such as New Zealand, Zimbabwe and Ireland, have printed unstamped aerograms.

References

External links
Formular Postal Stationery of Luxembourg

Postal stationery
Philatelic terminology
Envelopes